The Flame is a 1920 British silent romance film directed by Floyd Martin Thornton and starring Evelyn Boucher, Reginald Fox and Dora De Winton. It was based on a novel by Olive Wadsley.

Plot
As summarized in a film publication, Toni (Boucher) and her brother Fane (Thatcher) were adopted after the death of their father by their Uncle Charles (Cullin), and brought from the slums to the uncle's beautiful home, much to the disgust of the uncle's wife Lady Henrietta (De Winton). Fane is placed in a boys academy while Toni is sent to a convent. Fane turns out to be a haughty young Englishman while Toni cannot understand the changes in her brother. Lady Henrietta has had him raised to suit herself. Toni is then placed in a finishing school and, after she is expelled for going outside the walls, Lady Henrietta threatens to place her in a Dutch school where she would be punished for such a misdemeanor. Toni tells her troubles to Lord Robert Wyke, Lady Henrietta's brother who is kindly and devoted to Toni. He is secretly in love with Toni, but is not free to tell her because of a hastily and unfortunate marriage to an adventuress. After Robert is compelled to leave for business and Toni hears that she will be sent to the Dutch school, the girl follows Robert to Florence where she remains with the housekeeper of Count de Soulnes. Word arrives that Robert has been murdered, but later he arrives and it turns that his wife was killed in an automobile accident, leaving him free to marry Toni.

Cast
 Evelyn Boucher as Toni Saumarez 
 Reginald Fox as Lord Robert Wyke 
 Dora De Winton as Lady Henrietta 
 Fred Thatcher as Fane 
 Rowland Myles as Boris Ritsky 
 Ernest Maupain as Sparakoff 
 Arthur M. Cullin as Sir Charles Saumarez 
 Clifford Pembroke as Captain Wynford Saumarez 
 Frank Petley as Miskoff 
 J. Edwards Barker as Dr. Lindsay 
 Sydney Wood as Fane, as a child

References

Bibliography
 Low, Rachael. History of the British Film, 1918-1929. George Allen & Unwin, 1971.

External links

1920 films
British black-and-white films
1920s romance films
British romance films
British silent feature films
1920s English-language films
Films directed by Floyd Martin Thornton
Stoll Pictures films
Films based on British novels
1920s British films